Myers Park may refer to:

Myers Park, Auckland, New Zealand
Myers Park (Charlotte), a neighbourhood in Charlotte, North Carolina
Myers Park, Collin County, Texas